Kachan may refer to:

Places

Iran
 Kashan
 Kachan, Astaneh-ye Ashrafiyeh
 Kachan, Siahkal

Nepal
 Kachan, Nepal

People with the surname
 Arina Kachan (born 1994), Belarusian judoka